Charles Ferdinand "Chip" Glass (born June 25, 1947) is a former professional American football player who played tight end for six seasons for the Cleveland Browns and New York Giants.

References

1947 births
Living people
George D. Chamberlain High School alumni
People from Homestead, Florida
American football tight ends
Florida State Seminoles football players
Cleveland Browns players
New York Giants players
Sportspeople from Miami-Dade County, Florida